The 1938 Oklahoma gubernatorial election was held on November 8, 1938, and was a race for Governor of Oklahoma. Democrat  Leon 'Red' Phillips defeated Republican former State Senator Ross Rizley.  Also on the ballot were John Wesley Lanham of the Prohibition Party and Independent John Franing. This election is the last time an alternative party has had a primary for governor in Oklahoma, as the Prohibitionists chose Francis Simpson over Ralph Butterfield, but Simpson then withdrew and the party placed Lanham on the ballot as a replacement.

Democratic primary
Nine candidates vied for the Democratic nomination, including former governors Alfalfa Bill Murray and Jack C. Walton.  With the elimination of the runoff primary, Oklahoma House of Representatives Speaker Red Phillips eked out a narrow win over W. S. Key.

Results

Republican primary
Future Congressman Ross Rizley defeated two challengers by a wide margin to claim the GOP nomination.

Results

Prohibition primary
Francis Simpson defeated Ralph Butterfield in the primary but then withdrew.  John Wesley Lanham of Bethany was named as a replacement candidate. This was the only alternative party gubernatorial primary in Oklahoma until 2018.

Results

Results

References

1938
Gubernatorial
Okla